Arnold, a census-designated place (CDP) in Anne Arundel County, Maryland, United States, located just outside of the state's capital, Annapolis. It is located 18.78 miles south of Baltimore, and 29.97 miles east of Washington, D.C. The population was 23,106 at the 2010 census. Neighborhoods straddle College Parkway and Maryland Route 2 (Ritchie Highway). Arnold is located on the scenic Broadneck Peninsula. The ZIP code is 21012. It is bordered by Severna Park to the northwest, Cape Saint Claire to the southeast, Annapolis to the southwest, and Lake Shore (a CDP within Pasadena) to the northeast.

History
Native Americans are known to have resided in the region in pre-Columbian times based on artifacts found in the Ulmstead Point area dating back to the Archaic period (5000–1500 BC). Later tribes that have been in the area include the Algonquin tribes, among others. However, when Captain John Smith arrived in the area in 1608, he reported no Natives.

The early settlement of Arnold, an area between the Magothy and Severn rivers, began with the farm of John Arnold. He was a veteran of the War of 1812, who acquired  on the north side of the Severn River. One of his sons, Thomas Arnold, inherited the land, later working as the local station master for the Baltimore and Annapolis Short Line Railroad.

Residents know the area to have been home to a racetrack in the present-day Revell-Downs planned community and even a rollercoaster and boardwalk in Mago Vista Beach.

Education
Children in Arnold are served by the following public schools in the Anne Arundel County Public Schools district:

Elementary schools:
 Belvedere Elementary
 Broadneck Elementary
 Arnold Elementary
 Jones Elementary (Severna Park)
 Windsor Farm Elementary
 Cape St. Claire Elementry

Middle schools:
 Severn River Middle School
 Magothy River Middle School
 Severna Park Middle School (Severna Park)

High school:
 Broadneck High School
 Severna Park High School

Private schools:
 Arnold Christian Academy
 Severn School

Post-secondary:
 Anne Arundel Community College

Geography
Arnold is located at  (39.047263, −76.496552).

Demographics

As of the census of 2010, there were 23,106 people, 8,373 households, and 6,396 families residing in the CDP. The racial makeup of the CDP was 88.65% White, 5.23% African American, 0.23% Native American, 2.41% Asian, 0.03% Pacific Islander, 1.16% from other races, and 2.28% from two or more races. Hispanic or Latino of any race were 3.97% of the population.

There were 8,373 households, of which 40.2% had children under the age of 18 living with them; 63.8% were married couples living together, 9.5% had a female householder with no husband present, and 23.6% were non-families. 4.6% had someone living alone who was 65 years of age or older. The average household size was 2.76 and the average family size was 3.15.

In the CDP, the population was spread out, with 25.31% under the age of 18, 6.1% from 18 to 24, 30.6% from 25 to 44, 26.9% from 45 to 64, and 8.6% who were 65 years of age or older. The median age was 37 years. For every 100 females, there were 93.9 males. For every 100 females age 18 and over, there were 90.1 males.

According to a 2019 estimate, the median household income was $126,310.

Local attractions
Arnold contains many scenic riversides with cliffs and beaches, providing plenty of places for leisure and sightseeing. There are 12 marinas in Arnold. The Baltimore-Annapolis Bike Trail links Arnold to Annapolis and Severna Park with jogging and biking recreation. Arnold Park hosts a playground and provides open ball fields for sporting. Twin Oaks Park provides play equipment and a walking trail. Broadneck Park is located on the peninsula east of Arnold; this park has two enclosed areas for dogs (small and large). Bay Hills Golf Club was designed in 1969 by renowned golf course architect Ed Ault. The scenic 18-hole golf course finds its beauty in its wooded rolling terrain.

Marshes and creeks in the park are home to wildlife found throughout the Chesapeake Bay, including blue crabs, herons, terrapins, rockfish, and eagles.

Anne Arundel Community College is located in Arnold along College Parkway, and is annually rated one of the top community colleges in the nation. Historic synagogue Temple Beth Shalom also calls Arnold its home.

Maryland's State Tree
The Wilmer Stone White Oak in Arnold Park is set to be dedicated as the Maryland State Tree. The 200-year-old tree scored 402 points under a system that awards points for a tree's height, circumference and crown. It was named for the late Wilmer Stone, a noted forester who once owned the Arnold Park property where it stands. The Wilmer Stone White Oak now stands as the Maryland Champion of its species. As such, it is now eligible to become the official State Tree. A portion of the oak was destroyed in 1988, making it jut out to the side in a broken Y formation, or it would have surpassed the National Champion in Virginia, a 427 pointer. The honored tree stands proudly in the silent Arnold forest, broken only by the calls of ospreys, wrens, blue jays and cardinals. Deer and fox also populate the woodlands, darting among the black locust trees, wild grape vines and Virginia creeper.

Tall Trees of Chase Creek Woods
The variety of habitat supports large examples of nearly fifty native tree species. Chase Creek Woods is home to twelve of the tallest of their species on record in Maryland. Despite recent development, Chase Creek Woods is one of the county's outstanding natural areas. The 2003 study indicates that Chase Creek Woods is an important natural area worthy of protection.

Dr. Martin Luther King Jr. Memorial
Dr. King's memorial is the first in Maryland to be erected in his honor. It stands in Arnold's Anne Arundel Community College's west campus on a well-maintained terrace overlooking an outdoor amphitheater. Behind the statue, five bronze plaques mounted on a stone wall quote King's speeches calling for equal opportunities in education and a just society. The statue is nine feet six inches tall and mounted on a five-foot granite base.

Notable people
 Diane Black, congresswoman
Matthew Centrowitz Jr., Olympic track and field gold-medal winner

In popular culture
 A season 5 episode of the Discovery Channel series A Haunting, titled "Angels and Demons," takes place in Arnold in 2010–2011.

References

Census-designated places in Maryland
Census-designated places in Anne Arundel County, Maryland
Maryland populated places on the Chesapeake Bay
Suburbs of Annapolis, Maryland